Cecil Mack (November 6, 1873 – August 1, 1944) was an American composer, lyricist and music publisher.

Biography
Born as Richard Cecil McPherson in Portsmouth, Virginia, he attended the Norfolk Mission College and Lincoln University in Pennsylvania (class of 1897) before leaving to go to New York City where the 1900 Federal Census lists his occupation as a stenographer. Mack started writing song lyrics, starting with "Good Morning, Carrie" in 1901.  He co-founded the Gotham-Attucks Music Publishing Company in May 1905, in New York City; it was likely the first black-owned music publishing company. In July 1906, an article in The New York Age referred to Mack as the company's "secretary and treasurer and general business director." In 1907 he wrote the lyrics for the musical The Black Politician. In 1925 he co-wrote the book for the musical Mooching Along. Mack also formed a choir, the Southland Singers, that year. In 1931 he co-wrote the music for the musical Rhapsody in Black.

Birth date
His birthdate is also given as 1880 and 1883, and an 1876 date is shown by his World War I Draft Registration card, as referenced above, and the 1900 US Census, but an 1891 Navy Enlistment Record and the 1880 Federal census both point to an 1873 birth year.

Personal life 
Mack married Dr. Gertrude Curtis on April 8, 1912, in Manhattan. Curtis was a pioneering African-American dentist who practiced in Harlem. They remained married to her until his death. They had no children. Gertrude re-married in 1946 to Ulysses "Slow Kid" Thompson (1888–1990), a comedian.

Death
Mack died in Manhattan, aged 70. The New York Age, quoting his obituary from The Christian Science Monitor, observed, "Not even Irving Berlin exceeded the output of this talented New York Negro. His songs were as American as Stephen Foster's – one or two of them may be remembered as long – and were typically representative of the pre-radio era when fortunes were made over the 10-cent-store counters. Cecil Mack's songs were pure fun and never had an off-color line."

Notable works
As lyricist, Mack's notable works include:
"Good Morning, Carrie" (1901, co-wrote music and lyrics with J. Tim Brymn)
"Please Go Away and Let Me Sleep" (1902)
"He's a Cousin of Mine" (1902)
"The Little Gypsy Maid" (1904 or before)
"Zongo, My Congo Queen" (1904 or before)
"Teasing" (1904)
"All in down and out" (1906)
"You're In the Right Church (But the Wrong Pew)" (1908, co-wrote music and lyrics with Chris Smith)
"I'm Miss Hanna from Savannah" (between 1908 and 1910)
"That's Why They Call Me Shine"(1910)
"Way Down East" (1911) words by Cecil Mack, music by Joe Young and Harold Norman
"Someone's Waiting Down in Tennessee" (1912, co-wrote music and lyrics with James Reese Europe)
"Charleston" (1923, co-wrote music and lyrics with James P. Johnson)
"Old Fashioned Love" (1923, co-wrote music and lyrics with James P. Johnson for the show )

Bibliography

Notes

References linked to notes 

  ; ; .

 
<li>  p. 44.

 
  .
   .
<li> 

 

 

 
<li> 
<li> 
<li>

External links
Cecil Mack biodata

1873 births
1944 deaths
Songwriters from Virginia
American lyricists
Musicians from Portsmouth, Virginia
Musicians from New York City
African-American songwriters
Songwriters from New York (state)
20th-century African-American people